Fun guo, or Chaozhou fun guo, sometimes spelled fun quor, fun gor, fen guo, Chiu Chow dumpling, Teochew dumpling, or fun kor, is a variety of steamed dumpling from the Chaoshan area of coastal eastern Guangdong, a province in Southern China. Fun guo looks very similar to har gaw (shrimp dumplings) in Cantonese-style dim sum.

Teochew cuisine
In the Chaozhou dialect of Min Nan, the dumplings are called hung gue (粉餜), but they are more widely known by their Cantonese name. They are also eaten in non-Chaozhou regions of Guangdong.

Hawaiian cuisine
In Hawaii, fun guo is known as pepeiao, the Hawaiian word for ear, named for its shape resembling an ear.

See also
Chaozhou cuisine
 Dim sum

References

Dim sum
Dumplings
Pork dishes
Teochew cuisine